Harrow East is a constituency in Greater London created in 1945 and represented in the House of Commons of the UK Parliament since 2010 by Bob Blackman, a Conservative.

Constituency profile

The censuses of 2001 and 2011 show the overwhelmingly most common housing type of the area to be semi-detached houses – almost a majority – followed by mid-rise apartments (whether purpose-built or converted from older houses), then terraced houses and then detached houses. They also show a consistently lower-than-average proportion of social housing than for Greater London.

The constituency is served by three separate commuter railway lines running into central London, and has many parks and sports grounds. Few arterial roads bisect Harrow East – further east is the start of the M1 motorway, and in the middle of seats further south in north-west London are the A40 Western Avenue and North Circular Road, omitting the boundaries drawn from the arterial road-building projects of the 1940s-to-1970s period.

History

The seat was created in 1945 and has been varied due to two sets of major ward reconfigurations and by other national boundary reforms. The predecessor seats were Hendon and to a much lesser extent Harrow.

Since 1945 it has been a stronger area for the Labour Party than neighbouring Harrow West; nevertheless, the seat been mostly held by the Conservative Party. Labour did win here in landslide victories in 1945, 1966 and 1997, and after the latter, held on in the two subsequent general elections. The seat was regained in 2010 by a Conservative on a high turnout, though Labour's incumbent managed to hold on to Harrow West, largely due to boundary changes which favoured Labour there. Residents in the borough include fewer people in the category of no qualifications than the national average, in 2011, at 16.8%; Notably, Harrow East was the most ethnically diverse Conservative-held constituency in the general elections of 2015 and 2017, apparently bucking a trend whereby the party is generally less supported than Labour among ethnic minorities.

Commencing with the 1979 general election, the seat has been a bellwether by reflecting the national result. The 2017 result produced the 29th-most marginal majority of the Conservative Party's 317 seats by percentage of majority.

Boundaries
1945–1950: The Urban District of Harrow wards of Kenton, Stanmore North, Stanmore South, Wealdstone North, Wealdstone South, and part of Harrow Weald ward.

1950–1955: As above, but the whole of Harrow Weald, and without Wealdstone North or Wealdstone South.

1955–1974: The Municipal Borough of Harrow wards of Belmont, Harrow Weald, Queensbury, Stanmore North and Stanmore South.

1974–1978: The London Borough of Harrow wards of Belmont, Harrow Weald, Queensbury, Stanmore North and Stanmore South.

1978–1983: The London Borough of Harrow wards of Canons, Centenary, Harrow Weald, Kenton East, Stanmore Park, Stanmore South and Wemborough.

1983–2010: The London Borough of Harrow wards of Canons, Centenary, Greenhill, Harrow Weald, Kenton East, Kenton West, Marlborough, Stanmore Park, Stanmore South, Wealdstone and Wemborough.

2010–present: The London Borough of Harrow wards of Belmont, Canons, Edgware, Harrow Weald, Kenton East, Kenton West, Queensbury, Stanmore Park and Wealdstone.

Members of Parliament

Election results

Elections in the 2010s

Elections in the 2000s

Elections in the 1990s

Elections in the 1980s

Elections in the 1970s

Elections in the 1960s

Elections in the 1950s

Elections in the 1940s

See also
 List of parliamentary constituencies in London

Notes

References

External links 
Politics Resources (Election results from 1922 onwards)
Electoral Calculus (Election results from 1955 onwards)

Parliamentary constituencies in London
Constituencies of the Parliament of the United Kingdom established in 1945
Politics of the London Borough of Harrow